Southwest 6th & Madison Street and City Hall/Southwest 5th & Jefferson Street stations are a pair of light rail stations on the MAX Green, Orange and Yellow Lines in Portland, Oregon. It is the fifth stop southbound on the Portland Transit Mall extension.

The stations are built into the sidewalks of 5th and 6th Avenues, with the 5th Avenue platform heading southbound and the 6th Avenue platform northbound. They are located at the base of the PacWest Center. Points of interest include the Wells Fargo Center, the Portland Building, Portland City Hall, and other numerous government buildings in Downtown Portland. The station serves all bus lines on 5th Avenue and 45–Garden Home Rd, 58–Canyon Rd, 55-Hamilton and 38–Boones Ferry Rd. The stop ID number for the bus stop is 12791. On 5th Ave, lines 17–Hogate-Broadway, 9–Powell Blvd and 19–Woodstock-Gilsan are one block away from the station. The stop ID number for this bus stop is 7594.

When opened on August 30, 2009, the stations were located in Fareless Square (within fare zone 1), which was renamed the Free Rail Zone four months later, in January 2010. However, the fare-free zone was eliminated in 2012, when TriMet discontinued all use of fare zones.

External links
City Hall / SW 5th & Jefferson station information from TriMet
SW 6th & Madison station information from TriMet
MAX Light Rail Stations – more general TriMet page

MAX Light Rail double stations
MAX Green Line
MAX Yellow Line
Railway stations in the United States opened in 2009
2009 establishments in Oregon
Railway stations in Portland, Oregon